This is a list of African-American newspapers and media outlets.  For more detail on a given newspaper, see its entry in the List of African-American newspapers for its state, which is linked at See also: By state, below.

Print

{| class="wikitable sortable"
|+ class="nowrap" |African-American Newspapers
!Name||City||State||Founded||Closed
|-
|92d Buffalo||Fort Huachuca||Arizona||1943–1945||Defunct
|-
|93d Blue Helmet||Fort Huachuca||Arizona||1942–1943||Defunct
|-
|AC Phoenix News, The||Winston-Salem||North Carolina||1983||Extant
|-
|Advance, The||Wilmington||Delaware||1899–19?||Defunct
|-
|Advocate||Charleston||West Virginia||?||Defunct
|-
|Advocate, The||Portland||Oregon||1903–1933||Defunct
|-
|African Expositor||Raleigh||North Carolina||18??–18?||Defunct
|-
|African-American News and Issues||Houston||Texas||1996||Extant
|-
|Africo-American Presbyterian||Wilmington||North Carolina||1879–1938||Defunct
|-
|Afro-American Citizen, The||Charleston||South Carolina||1899–1902||Defunct
|-
|Afro-American Courier||Yazoo City||Mississippi||1926–19?||Defunct
|-
|Daily Record||Wilmington||North Carolina||1895–1898||Defunct
|-
|Aliened American, The||Cleveland||Ohio||1852–1856||Defunct
|-
|American Record||Plattsmouth||Nebraska||1945||Extant
|-
|Anti-Slavery Bugle, The||New Lisbon||Ohio||1845–1861||Defunct
|-
|Appeal, The||Saint Paul||Minnesota||1889–19?||Defunct
|-
|Arizona Gleam, The||Phoenix||Arizona||1929–193?||Defunct
|-
|Arizona Sun||Phoenix||Arizona||1942–196?||Defunct
|-
|Arizona Tribune||Phoenix||Arizona||1958–197?||Defunct
|-
|Atlanta Daily World||Atlanta||Georgia||1928||Extant
|-
|Baltimore Afro-American||Baltimore||Maryland||1892||Extant
|-
|Banner-Enterprise, The||Wilmington||North Carolina||1883–18?||Defunct
|-
|Bay State Banner||Boston||Massachusetts||1965||Extant
|-
|Beacon Journal (later Beacon Digest and West Virginia Beacon Digest)||Charleston||West Virginia||1957–||Defunct
|-
|Bee, The||Washington||D.C.||1882–1884||Defunct
|-
|Birmingham Times||Birmingham||Alabama||?||Extant
|-
|Black Chronicle||Oklahoma City||Oklahoma||1979||Extant
|-
|Black Panther,The||Oakland||California||1967–?||Defunct
|-
|Black Times: Voices of the National Community
|Palo Alto
|California
|1971–1976?
|Defunct
|-
|Boston Guardian||Boston||Massachusetts||1901–1950s||Defunct
|-
|Breeze||Huntington||West Virginia||?||Defunct
|-
|Broad Ax, The||Salt Lake City||Utah||1895–19?||Defunct
|-
|Burning Spear, The||Oakland||California||1968||Extant
|-
|Bystander, The||Des Moines||Iowa||1916–1922||Defunct
|-
|California Eagle||Los Angeles||California||1879–1964||Defunct
|-
|Call, The||Kansas City||Missouri||1919||Extant
|-
|Call and Post||Cleveland||Ohio||1928||Extant
|-
|Carolina Panorama, The||Columbia||South Carolina||1986||Extant
|-
|Carolina Times, The||Durham||North Carolina||1921||Extant
|-
|Cayton's Monthly||Seattle||Washington||1921–1921||Defunct
|-
|Cayton's Weekly||Seattle||Washington||1916–1921||Defunct
|-
|Century Voice, The||Yazoo City||Mississippi||194?–19?||Defunct
|-
|Charleston Advocate, The||Charleston||South Carolina||1867–1868||Defunct
|-
|Charleston Chronicle, The||Charleston||South Carolina||1971||Extant
|-
|Charlotte Post, The||Charlotte||North Carolina||1878||Extant
|-
|Chattanooga Observer, The||Chattanooga||Tennessee||1927–1962||Defunct
|-
|Chicago Defender||Chicago||Illinois||1905||Extant
|-
|Chicago Whip, The||Chicago||Illinois||1919–19?||Defunct
|-
|Chicago World||Chicago||Illinois||1918–19?||Defunct
|-
|Christian Banner||Philadelphia||Pennsylvania||||Defunct
|-
|Christian Recorder, The||Pittsburgh||Pennsylvania||1854||Extant
|-
|Cincinnati Herald, The||Cincinnati||Ohio||1955||Extant
|-
|Cleveland Gazette, The||Cleveland||Ohio||1883–1945||Defunct
|-
|Colored American, The||New York City||New York||1837–1842||Defunct
|-
|Colored American, The||Washington||D.C.||1893–1904||Defunct
|-
|Colored Citizen, The||Helena||Montana||1894–1894||Defunct
|-
|Columbus Times, The||Columbus||Georgia||1921||Extant
|-
|Community Citizen, The||New Albany||Mississippi||19??–19?||Defunct
|-
|Concordia Eagle, The||Vidalia||Louisiana||1873–1890||Defunct
|-
|Connecticut Chronicle||Hartford||Connecticut||194?–194?||Defunct
|-
|Afro-American Sentinel||Omaha||Nebraska||1892||Extant
|-
|Daily Express, The||Dayton||Ohio||1950–1955||Defunct
|-
|Daily National Era||Washington||D.C.||1854–1854||Defunct
|-
|Dallas Express||Dallas||Texas||1892–1970||Defunct
|-
|Dayton Forum, The||Dayton||Ohio||1913–1949||Defunct
|-
|Delta Leader, The||Greenville||Mississippi||1939–19?||Defunct
|-
|Denver Star, The||Denver||Colorado||1913–1963||Defunct
|-
|Detroit Tribune||Detroit||Michigan||1933–1933||Defunct
|-
|Detroit Tribune, The||Detroit||Michigan||1935–1966||Defunct
|-
|Ebony||Los Angeles||California||1945||Extant
|-
|Echo, The||Meridian||Mississippi||1942–1960||Defunct
|-
|Essence||New York||New York||1970||Extant
|-
|Facts, The||Seattle||Washington||1961||Extant
|-
|The Progress||Omaha||Nebraska||1889||Extant
|-
|Final Call, The||Chicago||Illinois||1979||Extant
|-
|Florida Sentinel Bulletin||Tampa||Florida||1919||Extant
|-
|Florida Star, The||Jacksonville||Florida||1951||Extant
|-
|Forum, The||Springfield||Illinois||1904–192?||Defunct
|-
|Franklin's Paper the Denver Star||Denver||Colorado||1912–1913||Defunct
|-
|Franklin's Paper the Statesman||Denver||Colorado||1906–1912||Defunct
|-
|Free Citizen, The||Orangeburg||South Carolina||1874–1876||Defunct
|-
|Free Press, The||Charleston||South Carolina||1868–186?||Defunct
|-
|Freedom||New York City||New York||1950–1955||Defunct
|-
|Freedom's Journal||New York City||New York||1827–1829||Defunct
|-
|Frost Illustrated||Fort Wayne||Indiana||1968||Defunct
|-
|Future Outlook, The||Greensboro||North Carolina||1941–1972||Defunct
|-
|Gary Crusader||Gary||Indiana||1961||Extant
|-
|Gazette, The||Raleigh||North Carolina||18??–1???||Defunct
|-
|Georgetown Planet, The||Georgetown||South Carolina||1873–1875||Defunct
|-
|Golden Rule, The||Vicksburg||Mississippi||1898–19?||Defunct
|-
|Gossip Depot free online news||Memphis||Tennessee||2020||Extant
|-
|Harambee News||Los Angeles||California||1966–1969||Defunct
|-
|Hartford Chronicle||Hartford||Connecticut||194?–1947||Defunct
|-
|Hartford-Springfield Chronicle||Springfield||Massachusetts||1940–194?||Defunct
|-
|Houston Forward Times||Houston||Texas||1960||Extant
|-
|Huntington Enterprise||Huntington||West Virginia||?||Defunct
|-
|Huntington Times||Huntington||West Virginia||?||Defunct
|-
|Illinois Times, The||Champaign||Illinois||19??–19?||Defunct
|-
|Indianapolis Freeman||Indianapolis||Indiana||1888–1926||Defunct
|-
|Indianapolis Leader||Indianapolis||Indiana||1879–1891||Defunct
|-
|Indianapolis Recorder||Indianapolis||Indiana||1895||Extant
|-
|Ink||Fort Wayne||Indiana||2001–?||Defunct
|-
|Iowa State Bystander||Des Moines||Iowa||1894–1916||Defunct
|-
|Jackson Advocate||Jackson||Mississippi||1938||Extant
|-
|Jet||Los Angeles||California||1951||Extant
|-
|St. Louis Palladium||St. Louis||Missouri||1884?–1911?||Defunct
|-
|Journal of Industry, The||Raleigh||North Carolina||1879–1???||Defunct
|-
|Kansas City Sun, The||Kansas City||Missouri||1908–1924||Defunct
|-
|Tribune de la Nouvelle-Orléans or New Orleans Tribune||New Orleans||Louisiana||1864–1870||Defunct
|-
|Langston City Herald, The||Langston City||Oklahoma||1891–1902||Defunct
|-
|Lexington Standard, The||Lexington||Kentucky||1892–1912||Defunct
|-
|Liberator, The||Boston||Massachusetts||1831–1865||Defunct
|-
|Los Angeles Sentinel||Los Angeles||California||1933||Extant
|-
|Louisiana Weekly, The||New Orleans||Louisiana||1925||Extant
|-
|Louisianian, The||New Orleans||Louisiana||1870–1871||Defunct
|-
|Louisville Defender||Louisville||Kentucky||1933||Extant
|-
|Maryville Republican||Maryville||Tennessee||1867–187?||Defunct
|-
|McDowell Herald||Keystone||West Virginia||?||Defunct
|-
|McDowell Times, The||Keystone||West Virginia||1904–1941||Defunct
|-
|Metropolis Weekly Gazette||Metropolis||Illinois||1???–19?||Defunct
|-
|Metropolitan News||Chicago||Illinois||1935–19?||Defunct
|-
|Miami Times, The||Miami||Florida||1923||Extant
|-
|Michigan Chronicle||Detroit||Michigan||1936||Extant
|-
|Missionary Record||Charleston||South Carolina||1868–1879||Defunct
|-
|Mojo||New York City||New York||1968–?||Defunct
|-
|Monitor, The||Omaha||Nebraska||1915||Extant
|-
|Montana Plaindealer, The||Helena||Montana||1906–1911||Defunct
|-
|Muhammad Speaks||Chicago||Illinois||1962||Extant
|-
|Muskogee Cimeter, The||Muskogee||Oklahoma||1901–19?||Defunct
|-
|Muslim Journal||Chicago||Illinois||1962||Extant
|-
|Nashville Globe||Nashville||Tennessee||1906–1960||Defunct
|-
|National Enquirer and Pennsylvania Freeman||Philadelphia||Pennsylvania||1836–?||Defunct
|-
|National Era, The||Washington||D.C.||1847–1860||Defunct
|-
|National Forum, The||Washington||D.C.||1910–19?||Defunct
|-
|National Savings Bank||Washington||D.C.||1868–18?||Defunct
|-
|New Age, The||Portland||Oregon||1896||Defunct
|-
|New Age, The||Butte||Montana||1902–190?||Defunct
|-
|New England Bulletin||Hartford||Connecticut||1949–19?||Defunct
|-
|New Era||Washington||D.C.||1870–1870||Defunct
|-
|New Era, The||Omaha||Nebraska||1921||Extant
|-
|New Journal and Guide||Norfolk||Virginia||1900||Extant
|-
|New National Era||Washington||D.C.||1870–1874||Defunct
|-
|New Orleans Tribune, The||New Orleans||Louisiana||1985||Extant
|-
|New York Amsterdam News||New York City||New York||1909||Extant
|-
|North Carolina Gazette||Raleigh||North Carolina||1885–18?||Defunct
|-
|North Carolina Republican||Raleigh||North Carolina||1879–1880||Defunct
|-
|North Star, The||Rochester||New York||1847–1851||Defunct
|-
|Northwestern Bulletin, The||St. Paul||Minnesota||1922–1924||Defunct
|-
|Northwestern Bulletin-Appeal, The||St. Paul||Minnesota||1924–1925||Defunct
|-
|Oakland Post, The||Oakland||California||1963||Extant
|-
|Ohio Daily-Express, The||Dayton||Ohio||1946–1950||Defunct
|-
|Ohio State News||Columbus||Ohio||1944–1952||Defunct
|-
|Omaha Chronicle||Omaha||Nebraska||1933||Extant
|-
|Omaha Guide||Omaha||Nebraska||1927||Extant
|-
|Omaha Star||Omaha||Nebraska||1938||Extant
|-
|Omaha Whip, The||Omaha||Nebraska||1922||Extant
|-
|Our Time Press||Brooklyn||New York||1996||Extant
|-
|Peoples' Advocate, The||New Bern||North Carolina||1886–188?||Defunct
|-
|People's Advocate, The||Alexandria||Virginia||1874||Extant
|-
|People's Recorder, The||Columbia||South Carolina||1893–1925||Defunct
|-
|Philadelphia Independent, The||Philadelphia||Pennsylvania||1931–1971||Defunct
|-
|Philadelphia Tribune||Philadelphia||Pennsylvania||1884||Extant
|-
|Phoenix Index, The||Phoenix||Arizona||193?–19?||Defunct
|-
|Phoenix Tribune||Phoenix||Arizona||1918–193?||Defunct
|-
|Pioneer||Montgomery||West Virginia||?||Defunct
|-
|Pioneer Press||Martinsburg||West Virginia||1882–19?||Defunct
|-
|Pittsburgh Courier||Pittsburgh||Pennsylvania||1907–1966||Defunct
|-
|Portland Observer, The||Portland||Oregon||1970||Extant
|-
|Portland Times, The||Portland||Oregon||about 1919.||Defunct
|-
|Professional World, The||Columbia||Missouri||1901–192?||Defunct
|-
|Ravenswood Post
|Menlo Park
|California
|1953–1981
|Defunct
|-
|Republican, The||Maryville||Tennessee||187?–187?||Defunct
|-
|Richmond Free Press||Richmond||Virginia||1992||Extant
|-
|Rising Son, The||Kansas City||Missouri||1896–19?||Defunct
|-
|Roanoke Tribune||Roanoke||Virginia||1936||Extant
|-
|Robbins Eagle, The||Robbins||Illinois||1951–1963||Defunct
|-
|Rock Hill Messenger, The||Rock Hill||South Carolina||1896–1921||Defunct
|-
|Sacramento Observer, The||Sacramento||California||1962||Extant
|-
|San Francisco Bay View||San Francisco||California||1976||Extant
|-
|Savannah Tribune||Savannah||Georgia||1875||Extant
|-
|Seattle Medium||Seattle||Washington||1970||Extant
|-
|Seattle Republican, The||Seattle||Washington||1???–1915||Defunct
|-
|Sedalia Weekly Conservator||Sedalia||Missouri||1903–1909||Defunct
|-
|Semi-Weekly Louisianian||New Orleans||Louisiana||1871–1872||Defunct
|-
|Skanner, The||Portland||Oregon||1975||Extant
|-
|Soigne`+Swank Magazine||Wabasso||Florida||2020||Extant
|-
|South Carolina Leader||Charleston||South Carolina||1865–18?||Defunct
|-
|South Florida Times||Oakland Park||Florida||?||Extant
|-
|Southern Advocate, The||Mound Bayou||Mississippi||1933–19?||Defunct
|-
|Southern Indicator, The||Columbia||South Carolina||1903–1925||Defunct
|-
|Southern News, The||Asheville||North Carolina||1936–19?||Defunct
|-
|Southland Advocate, The||Asheville||North Carolina||19??–????||Defunct
|-
|St. Louis Argus||St. Louis||Missouri||1912||Extant
|-
|St. Louis Sentinel||St. Louis||Missouri||1968||Extant
|-
|St. Paul Echo||St. Paul||Minnesota||1925–1927||Defunct
|-
|Statesman, The. [volume]||Denver||Colorado||1889–1906||Defunct
|-
|Sun-Reporter||San Francisco||California||1943||Extant
|-
|Tennessee Tribune||Nashville||Tennessee||1992||Extant
|-
|Enterprise, The||Omaha||Nebraska||1893||Extant
|-
|The Topeka Plaindealer, The||Topeka||Kansas||1900–1932||Defunct
|-
|Tribune Independent of Michigan, The||Detroit||Michigan||1933–1935||Defunct
|-
|Tribune, The||Roanoke||Virginia||1951–19?||Defunct
|-
|Tri-State Defender||Memphis||Tennessee||1951||Extant
|-
|Tulsa Star, The||Tulsa||Oklahoma||1913–1921||Defunct
|-
|Twin City Star, The'||Minneapolis||Minnesota||1910–19?||Defunct
|-
|Vanguard News||Terre Haute||Indiana||1994–1995 ||Defunct
|-
|Voice of the People||Laurel||Mississippi||19??–19?||Defunct
|-
|Washington Afro-American, The||Washington||D.C.||1892||Extant
|-
|Washington Bee, The||Washington||D.C.||1882–1922||Defunct
|-
|Washington Informer, The||Washington||D.C.||1964||Extant
|-
|Washington Sun, The||Washington||D.C.||1960s (mid)||Extant
|-
|West Virginia Digest||Charleston||West Virginia||?||Defunct
|-
|West Virginia Eagle||Montgomery||West Virginia||?||Defunct
|-
|West Virginia Enterprise||Charleston||West Virginia||?||Defunct
|-
|West Virginia Spokesman||Huntington||West Virginia||?||Defunct
|-
|West Virginia Weekly||Charleston||West Virginia||?||Defunct
|-
|Wilmington Journal||Wilmington||North Carolina||1928||Extant
|-
|Winston-Salem Chronicle||Winston-Salem||North Carolina||1974||Extant
|}

Online
 Atlanta Black Star
 Parlé Magazine
 Black News
 The Grio
 The Miami Times
 The Root The Skanner NewsOne''
 The North Star, an online newspaper launched in 2018 by activist Shaun King
 Black Report
 Blacksourcemedia.com
 themetrorecord.com
 TJG News
 Shine My Crown

See also
 African-American newspapers
 List of newspapers in the United States
 National Newspaper Publishers Association

By state 
Alabama |
Alaska |
Arizona |
Arkansas |
California |
Colorado |
Connecticut |
Delaware |
Florida |
Georgia |
Hawaii |
Illinois |
Indiana |
Iowa |
Kansas |
Kentucky |
Louisiana |
Maryland |
Massachusetts |
Michigan |
Minnesota |
Mississippi |
Missouri |
Montana |
Nebraska |
Nevada |
New Jersey |
New Mexico |
New York |
North Carolina |
Ohio |
Oklahoma |
Oregon |
Pennsylvania |
Rhode Island |
South Carolina |
Tennessee |
Texas |
Utah |
Virginia |
Washington (state) |
Washington, D. C. |
West Virginia |
Wisconsin

References

Further reading
 

Newspapers

African-American